"He's Misstra Know-It-All" is a single by Stevie Wonder for the Tamla (Motown) label, from his Innervisions album, which reached number 10 on the UK Singles Chart in May 1974. The song takes the form of a mellow ballad with a steady beat, principally a solo performance with Wonder providing lead vocal, background vocal, piano, drums, handclaps and congas. Ethereal flute-like sounds are provided by his TONTO modular synthesiser. Willie Weeks, on electric bass, is the only other musician. Towards the end of the song the mood changes to a stronger feel, more strident singing and with hand-claps emphasising the beat, half-beat and quarter-beat.

The song was released again in 1977 in both the UK and US as the B-side to "Sir Duke".

The song is essentially a long description of a know-it-all confidence trickster character who is a "man with a plan", who has a slick answer to all his critics and who has "a counterfeit dollar in his hand." It has been alleged that this is a reference to United States' President Richard Nixon.

Track listing 
A. "He's Misstra Know-It-All" – 3:25 (Stevie Wonder) 
B. "You Can't Judge a Book by Its Cover" (Wonder, Henry Cosby, Sylvia Moy)

Personnel
Stevie Wonder – lead vocal, background vocal, piano, drums, handclaps, TONTO synthesizer, congas
Willie Weeks – electric bass

References

1973 songs
1974 singles
Stevie Wonder songs
Songs written by Stevie Wonder
Tamla Records singles